Asabe Vilita Bashir (born in 1965) is a Nigerian politician. She was elected to the Nigerian House of Representatives as a candidate of the ruling party APC in the federal constituency of Gwoza, Chibok and Damboa Borno State. She particularly advocates for women and children specially victims of Boko Haram insurgency.

Education
Bashir received her GCE certificate from the Federal Government College at Maiduguri in 1984. She then enrolled in the University of Maiduguri to study education. She was awarded the BSc in education in 1988, the MEd in Administration and Planning in 1992, and a PhD in Philosophy in 2002.

Career
She is a member of Nigeria's Federal House of Representative, representing the Gwoza, Chibok and Damboa federal constituencies in Borno State. She advocates project that will improve the lives of Boko Haram insurgency victims, especially women and children.

References

External links
Profile  at National Assembly website

Living people
Nigerian women in politics
Members of the House of Representatives (Nigeria)
1965 births